Kahmora Hall (born September 13, 1991) is the stage name of Paul Tran, a drag performer most known for competing on season 13 of RuPaul's Drag Race.

Career
Kahmora Hall was the first contestant eliminated from season 13 of RuPaul's Drag Race. She wore an original Bob Mackie dress on the show. Michelle Kim of them magazine said her lip sync to "100% Pure Love" against Denali "will go down in Drag Race herstory". In 2022, Hall returned to the show as a guest on the 5th episode of season 14, along with Tempest DuJour and Jaymes Mansfield. Hall, along with fellow RuPaul's Drag Race alumni Ginger Minj and Kornbread "The Snack" Jeté, appeared in Hocus Pocus 2.

Personal life
Tran studied at Niles West High School and Loyola University and lives in Chicago. In 2021, he said he has experienced microaggressions in drag competitions for being Asian. Tajma Hall is Kahmora Hall's "drag mother". Fellow Season 13 contestant Tamisha Iman is also Hall's "drag mother" after she was adopted into the Iman Dynasty.

Filmography

Television

Film

Web series

References

External links

 
 Kahmora Hall at IMDb

Living people
1991 births
Asian-American drag queens
Loyola University Chicago alumni
Participants in American reality television series
People from Chicago
Kahmora Hall